Theta Ursae Majoris (Theta UMa, θ Ursae Majoris, θ UMa) is a suspected spectroscopic binary star system in the northern circumpolar constellation of Ursa Major. It has an apparent visual magnitude of 3.17, placing it among the brighter members of this constellation.

In 1976, this was reported as a spectroscopic binary system by Helmut A. Abt and Saul G. Levy, giving it an orbital period of 371 days. However, this was brought into question by Christopher L. Morbey and Roger F. Griffin in 1987, who suggested that the data could be explained by random chance. Further observations in 2009 with observations with the Bok Telescope in Arizona did show changes of 180 m/s in radial velocity, although there was not sufficient evidence to support a Keplerian orbit. There is a 14th-magnitude common proper motion companion to Theta Ursae Majoris at an angular separation of 4.1 arcseconds, so this may potentially be a triple star system.

The primary component of this putative system has a published stellar classification of F6 IV, indicating it is a subgiant star that is evolving away from the main sequence. In 2009, Helmut A. Abt listed it with a stellar classification of F7 V, suggesting that it is still on the main sequence. It is larger than the Sun with 141% of the Sun's mass and 250% of the Sun's radius. Consequently, it is shining brighter and evolving more rapidly than the Sun, with a luminosity nearly eight times the Sun's at an age of 2.2 billion years. This energy is being radiated from the star's outer atmosphere at an effective temperature of 6,300 K. At this heat, the star glows with the yellow-white hue of an F-type star.

The McDonald Observatory team has set limits to the hypothetical presence of one or more planets around the primary with masses between 0.24 and 4.6 Jupiter masses and average separations spanning between 0.05 and 5.2 AU.

Naming and etymology
 With τ, h, υ, φ, e, and f, it composed the Arabic asterism Sarīr Banāt al-Na'sh, the Throne of the daughters of Na'sh, and Al-Haud, the Pond. According to the catalogue of stars in the Technical Memorandum 33-507 - A Reduced Star Catalog Containing 537 Named Stars, Al-Haud were the title for seven stars : f as Alhaud I, τ as Alhaud II, e as Alhaud III, h as Alhaud IV, this star (θ) as Alhaud V, υ as Alhaud VI and φ as Alhaud VII .

References

Ursae Majoris, Theta
Ursa Major (constellation)
Binary stars
F-type subgiants
Alhaud V
Ursae Majoris, 25
046853
3775
082328
Durchmusterung objects